The 2004 Scottish Cup Final was played on 22 May 2004 at Hampden Park in Glasgow and was the final of the 118th Scottish Cup. The final was contested by Dunfermline Athletic and Celtic. Celtic came from behind to win the match 3–1.

Match details

References

2004
Scottish Cup Final 2004
Scottish Cup Final 2004
Cup Final
2000s in Glasgow